Wola is a district in western Warsaw, Poland, formerly the village of Wielka Wola, incorporated into Warsaw in 1916. An industrial area with traditions reaching back to the early 19th century, it underwent a transformation into an office (commercial) and residential district. Several museums are located in Wola, notably the Warsaw Uprising Museum.

History
First mentioned in the 14th century, it became the site of the elections, from 1573 to 1764, of Polish kings by the szlachta (nobility) of the Polish–Lithuanian Commonwealth. The Wola district later became famous for the Polish Army's defence of Warsaw in 1794 during the Kościuszko Uprising and in 1831 during the November Uprising, when Józef Sowiński and Józef Bem defended the city against Tsarist forces.

During the Warsaw Uprising (August–October 1944), fierce battles raged in Wola. Around 8 August, Wola was the scene of the largest single massacre by German forces  in Poland, of 40,000 to 50,000 civilians. The area was held by Polish fighters belonging to the Armia Krajowa.

Neighbourhoods
 
Wola is divided into the neighbourhoods (osiedle) of Czyste, Koło, Mirów, Młynów, Nowolipki, Odolany, Powązki and Ulrychów neighbourhoods, which in many cases correspond to old villages or settlements.

See also
 Electio Viritim Monument

References

External links